Bag-o Abo (historically Bagabu Islet) is a small, wooded island in northeastern Iloilo, Philippines. It is part of the municipality of Concepcion.

Location and geography 

Bag-o Abo Island is east of Panay Island in the Visayan Sea.

See also 

 List of islands in the Philippines

References

External links
 Bag-o Abo Island at OpenStreetMap

Islands of Iloilo